Stylianos "Stelios" Bisbas (Greek: Στυλιανός "Στέλιος" Μπίσμπας; born 9 November 1968 in Athens) is a retired Greek athlete who specialised in the sprint hurdles. He represented his country at the 1996 Summer Olympics without qualifying for the second round. In addition, he won silver at the 1993 Mediterranean Games and bronze at the 1993 Summer Universiade.

His personal bests are 13.61 seconds in the 110 metres hurdles (Athens 1996) and 7.70 in the 60 metres hurdles (Piraeus 1996).

Competition record

1Did not start in the semifinals

References

1968 births
Living people
Greek male hurdlers
Athletes from Athens
Athletes (track and field) at the 1996 Summer Olympics
Olympic athletes of Greece
Universiade medalists in athletics (track and field)
Mediterranean Games silver medalists for Greece
Mediterranean Games medalists in athletics
Athletes (track and field) at the 1987 Mediterranean Games
Athletes (track and field) at the 1993 Mediterranean Games
Universiade bronze medalists for Greece
Competitors at the 1989 Summer Universiade
Competitors at the 1995 Summer Universiade
Medalists at the 1993 Summer Universiade